The Zee Cine Award Best Actor in a Supporting Role – Female is chosen by the viewers, and the winner is announced at the actual ceremony.

The award is given in March, but the actress who wins it is awarded for her work from a movie released in the previous year from January 1 to December 31.

Sushmita Sen, Divya Dutta, Swara Bhaskar, and Shabana Azmi are the four actresses to have won this award twice to date.

The most recent recipient is Bhumi Pednekar.

Winner

See also
 Zee Cine Awards
 Bollywood
 Cinema of India

References

Film awards for supporting actress
International film awards
Zee Cine Awards